Daniel Escoda Villacorta (born 2 May 1970) is a Spanish lawyer, businessperson and university teacher.

He has been the chief legal officer (CLO) of the multinational company Telefónica for almost twenty years.

Early life and education 

He was born in Barcelona in 1970, but moved to Madrid with his family as a child. He studied secondary education at the private school Colegio CEU San Pablo in Madrid.

He graduated in law from the Complutense University of Madrid and later graduated in Business Administration in the CEU San Pablo University. He then did a master's degree (LLM) in European Union Law at the College of Europe in Bruges (Belgium), sponsored by the Spanish Ministry of Foreign Affairs.

Career 
Member of the Madrid Bar Association (ICAM), he has been a lawyer since 1995. He specializes in Corporate Law, European Union Law, Competition Law, Foreign Investment and Public Law and Regulatory Law. In 1995 he began working as an associate attorney at the "Iberforo-Madrid" law firm, specializing in Competition Law, Corporate Law, Banking Law and Tax Law.

Later, in 1999, he began working as a attorney at the multinational company Telefónica, where he developed a large part of his professional career. After some years as a lawyer, he was appointed chief legal officer (CLO) and director of the legal department of the multinational company Telefónica, being in charge (head) of its legal department as chief legal advisor, and member of the Board of Directors of the company, first with César Alierta as the CEO and later with José María Álvarez-Pallete as the CEO.

As a lawyer, he is a member of the Spanish Association for the Protection of Competition (AEDC) and also of the Spanish Professional Association of Privacy (APEP). Furthermore, he is a member of the Board of Directors of the Spanish Association for the Protection of Competition (AEDC) since 2012 when he was elected and was reelected in 2015.

In addition to being a lawyer and businessman, he also works as a university teacher in different master's degrees and postgraduate studies in relation to Competition Law, Banking Law or Digital Law. Currently he teaches at the CEU San Pablo University. He is professor of EU Competition Law at the CEU San Pablo University and lecturer on Digital Economy Law at its masters in International Business Law.

He has also been a university professor and has taught at universities such as the Complutense University of Madrid, the Menéndez Pelayo International University, the Technical University of Madrid, and others.

Publications 

 2017, "Prohibition of abuse of dominant position". In Competition Law Treaty: European Union and Spain, José María Beneyto Pérez (dir.) and Jerónimo Maillo González-Orús (dir.), (Bosch - Wolters Kluwer, Madrid, 2017).
 2003, "Competition regulations in the face of product and service bundling strategies carried out by operators that enjoy a dominant position in the telecommunications sector.". In Regulation and competition in telecommunications, José María Beneyto Pérez (dir.) and Jerónimo Maillo González-Orús (coord.) (Dykinson, Madrid, 2003).

See also 
 José María Álvarez-Pallete
 César Alierta
 Telefónica

References 

1970 births
Living people
Spanish lawyers
Lawyers
Complutense University of Madrid alumni
College of Europe alumni